D45 may refer to:

 D45 road (Croatia)
 Dresden 45, an American band
 , a Danae-class light cruiser of the Royal Navy
 Martin D-45, an acoustic guitar
 Polycythemia vera
 Semi-Slav Defense, a chess opening